Femmes fantastiques is a collection of ten short stories in French by Canadian writer Paul Laurendeau, published by Editions Jets d'encre in 2008.

Set in the imaginary lands of New-Navarre and the Domanial Republic, Femmes fantastiques gathers the stories of some twenty women (and four or five men), relating the tumult and complexity of their intimate and social  lives. The stories are bound together by a web of connections, some characters making appearances in the stories of others. Saphism being a social norm in this imaginary universe, the love these women experience is often with other women. In these imagined worlds many of our own social conventions are often presented as peculiar or are simply absent:  people may forget to ring the door before entering or may be completely oblivious to the waves on the sea.

The dominant themes binding these diverse stories are female intimate friendship and homosexuality, day to day feminism and the redefinition of masculinity. Our own ordinary realities often strike the characters as quite out of the ordinary and vice versa.

External links
 Summary of the collection of short stories and brief bio of the author (in French)
 Review of the collection of short stories in  Le portail d'Albert (in French)
 Review of the collection of short stories in  Zen Evasion (in French)

Canadian short story collections
2008 short story collections
French-language books